Melody of Love is a 1932 German operetta film directed by Georg Jacoby and starring Richard Tauber, Petra Unkel and S.Z. Sakall. It was shot at the Johannisthal Studios in Berlin with sets designed by the art director Max Heilbronner. It premiered on 24 April 1932. It is also known in English by the alternative title Right to Happiness.

Cast
Richard Tauber as R. Hoffmann, chamber singer
Petra Unkel as Gloria Hoffmann
S. Z. Sakall as Bernhard
Lien Deyers as Escha
Alice Treff as Lilli
Grete Natzler as Hella
Anton Walbrook as bandmaster
Karl Etlinger as Lilli's father
Ida Wüst as Lilli's mother
Miss Berley as nurse
Angelo Ferrari as Lilli's friend
Die Parkers as four bar singers
Greta Keller as singer

References

Bibliography 
 Klaus, Ulrich J. Deutsche Tonfilme: Jahrgang 1932. Klaus-Archiv, 1988.

External links

Films of the Weimar Republic
1932 musical films
German musical films
Operetta films
Films directed by Georg Jacoby
Films about singers
German black-and-white films
1930s German films
Films shot at Johannisthal Studios